Kandakurthi is a village in Renjal Mandal, Nizamabad District, Telangana, India.

Kandakurthi is called a Triveni Sangamam because the rivers Manjira and Haridra join Godavari here. There is a Shiva Temple on the banks of Godavari, and the period of its construction is yet to be studied. 

The Nearest city is Nizamabad.

External links
 https://facebook.com/Kandakurthy

Villages in Nizamabad district